The Signal of Liberty was an anti-slavery newspaper published in the mid-19th century in Michigan. The decision to publish a newspaper was one of the outcomes of the founding meeting of the Michigan Anti-Slavery Society that met for several days beginning on November 10, 1836 in Ann Arbor of the Michigan Territory (1805–1837). In 1838, Nicholas and William Sullivan published Michigan's first antislavery newspaper, the American Freedmen in Jackson, Michigan. Seymour Treadwell published and was the editor of the Michigan Freeman in 1839. The papers did not have a regular printing schedule.

The Signal of Liberty was published weekly from April 1841 to 1848 in Ann Arbor by Rev. Guy Beckley and Theodore Foster, who were co-editors. It was printed on Broadway Avenue on the second floor of Josiah Beckley's merchantile shop. The purpose of the newspaper was to encourage anti-slavery sentiment by sharing the stories of the lives of enslaved people. They interviewed freedom seekers who left their slaveholders and passed through or settled in Michigan. When African Americans escaped slavery, they were often pursued by slave catchers. The Signal of Liberty covered the stories of "kidnapping outrages" like the Kentucky raid in Cass County (1847), the Crosswhite Affair in Marshall, and raids that occurred in Detroit. There were regular sections in the paper for national news, antislavery society news, and poetry. It announced antislavery societies that were established throughout Michigan. The newspaper served its subscribers in Michigan and the Midwest. After the newspaper closed, Michigan Liberty Press was published.

Promoting antislavery messages could be dangerous. Throughout the 1830s, anti-slavery lecturers faced angry crowds. Abolitionist Elijah Parish Lovejoy was killed in Alton, Illinois, by a pro-slavery mob in the fall of 1837 after he refused to give up his printing press.

See also
 The Liberator (newspaper)

References

External links
 Digitized versions of Signal of Liberty, 1841 to 1848, Ann Arbor District Library

African-American newspapers
Abolitionist newspapers published in the United States
Defunct newspapers published in Michigan
Mass media in Ann Arbor, Michigan
19th century in Michigan
African-American history of Michigan
United States documents
Publications established in 1841
Publications disestablished in 1848
1841 establishments in Michigan
1848 disestablishments in Michigan